Clayton Riley Lusk (December 21, 1872 in Lisle, Broome County, New York – February 1959) was an American lawyer and politician from New York. He is now mostly remembered  as chairman of the "Lusk Committee", and was Acting Lieutenant Governor of New York in 1922.

Biography
Lusk was the son of Samuel Lusk and Clara Root Lusk. He graduated from Cortland Normal School in 1895, graduated LL.B. from Cornell Law School, was admitted to the bar in 1902, and practiced law in partnership with Rowland L. Davis in Cortland. Lusk entered politics as a Republican, and was City Judge of Cortland from 1904 to 1909.
 
He was a member of the New York State Senate (40th D.) from 1919 to 1924, sitting in the 142nd, 143rd, 144th, 145th, 146th and 147th New York State Legislatures. From 1919 to 1920, he chaired the Joint Legislative Committee to Investigate Seditious Activities, which consisted of four senators and five assemblymen and was known popularly as the "Lusk Committee."

Lusk was Temporary President of the State Senate from 1921 to 1922. On September 26, 1922, upon the resignation of Lt. Gov. Jeremiah Wood, who was appointed a judge of the New York Court of Claims, Lusk became Acting Lieutenant Governor until the end of the year serving under Governor Nathan Lewis Miller. He was Minority Leader from 1923 to 1924. At the end of his third term, he came under scrutiny for allegedly having accepted gifts from various companies to support or oppose legislation.

A stadium at the State University of New York at Cortland is named in his honor. He was a member of the Young Men's Debating Club (today the Delphic Fraternity) at the Cortland Normal School.

Clayton R. Lusk was also a member of the Cortland County Bar Association, the Masonic Cortlandville Lodge, and the First Presbyterian Church of Cortland.

Sources
"Clayton R. Lusk, legislator, dies: Former Republican leader of State Senate acted as Governor in 1922" in NYT on February 15, 1959, p. 85.
Mencken's America by Henry Louis Mencken and S. T. Joshi (Ohio University Press, 2004,  ; page 221.)
The Cortland Normal News, Volume 16, No. 4, December 1893, page 21.
Family Tree Maker's Genealogy Descendants of Daniel Meekes.
The Cortland Standard, February 16 & 19, 1959.
The Delphic Fraternity, Inc.

	

1872 births
1959 deaths
Lieutenant Governors of New York (state)
Republican Party New York (state) state senators
People from Lisle, New York
People from Cortland County, New York
Cornell Law School alumni
Majority leaders of the New York State Senate